Henry-Robert Brésil (1952–1999) was a Haitian painter. Hailing from Gonaïves, Brésil typically painted landscapes. His work has been exhibited in the United States, Puerto Rico, France, Italy, and Switzerland and has received recognition from the New York Times and the Miami Herald.

References
 

1952 births
Haitian artists
Haitian painters
Haitian male painters
1999 deaths